Kayardild is a moribund Tangkic language spoken by the Kaiadilt on the South Wellesley Islands, north west Queensland, Australia, with fewer than ten fluent speakers remaining. Other members of the family include Yangkaal (spoken by the Yangkaal people), Lardil, and Yukulta (Ganggalidda).
It is famous for its many unusual case phenomena, including case stacking of up to four levels, the use of clause-level case to signal interclausal relations and pragmatic factors, and another set of 'verbal case' endings which convert their hosts from nouns into verbs morphologically.

Phonology

References

Bibliography

Further reading
 Evans, Nicholas.  1988. Odd topic marking in Kayardild.  In Peter Austin, ed., Complex sentence constructions in Australian Languages.  Amsterdam: John Benjamins. pp. 219–266.
 Evans, Nicholas. 1992. Kayardild Dictionary and Thesaurus.  University of Melbourne: Department of Linguistics and Language Studies.
 Evans Nicholas. 1995b. A Grammar of Kayardild.  Berlin: Mouton de Gruyter.
 Evans, Nicholas. 1995c. The Kayardild language. In Julia Robinson, ed. Voices of Queensland. Melbourne: Oxford University Press.
 Evans, Nicholas. 1995d.  Multiple case in Kayardild: anti-iconicity and the diachronic filter. In F. Plank, ed., Double case. Agreement by Suffixaufnahme. Oxford: University Press. pp. 396–428.
 Evans, Nicholas. 2001. Typologies of agreement: some problems from Kayardild. Transactions of the Philological Society 101.2:203-234.
 Evans, Nicholas. 2006. Kayardild. In Keith Brown (ed.), Encyclopaedia of Language and Linguistics, Vol. 6.  Oxford: Elsevier.  pp. 168–9.
 Round, Erich. 2009. Kayardild Morphology, Phonology, and Morphosyntax. PhD dissertation, Yale University.
 Round, Erich. 2013. Kayardild Morphology and Syntax. Oxford: Oxford University Press.
 Round, Erich and Corbett, Greville G. 2016. The theory of feature systems: one feature versus two for Kayardild tense-aspect-mood. Morphology 27 (1) 1-55.

Critically endangered languages
Endangered languages of Oceania
North West Queensland
Tangkic languages